Toney Mountain is an elongated snow-covered shield volcano,  long and rising to  at Richmond Peak, located  southwest of Kohler Range in Marie Byrd Land, Antarctica.

Toney Mountain is an elongated volcanic massif that rises from a basaltic lava plateau. The slopes of the volcano feature parasitic vents and glacial corries, and are much steeper north of the volcano than south of it. Most of the mountain is covered by ice and its eastern sector may be a crater. That the mountain is mostly ice covered makes it difficult to determine its composition, the origin of the elongated shape of the volcano and the volcanological relation between the parasitic cinder cones and the main volcanic pile.

The plateau and parasitic cones are formed by hawaiite and the few outcrops on the main volcano by benmoreite and comendite. They contain phenocrysts of olivine, plagioclase, pyroxene and titanaugite in the former and of clinopyroxene, feldspar and olivine.
 
An age of 9.1 million years ago has been obtained on a basaltic lava flow beneath the volcano, and it has been inferred that the basal plateau formed between 10.1 and 9.1 million years ago. The massif is younger, with ages ranging from 1 million years in its lower parts to 500,000 years ago. Holocene eruptions may have also occurred at Toney Mountain as indicated by 30 kyr ash layers in ice cores from Byrd Station, although Mount Takahe and Mount Waesche are also candidates. During that time period, a number of volcanic eruptions occurred in Antarctica as recorded by ash layers in ice; this coincides with the coldest period of the Wisconsin glaciation and it is possible that the effects of ash clouds from the Antarctic eruptions caused this period of cold global temperatures. On the other hand, it is also possible that growing ice sheets during this period compressed magma chambers and thus triggered explosive eruptions.

Toney Mountain lies in Marie Byrd Land, a tectonically and volcanically active region of Antarctica. These basaltic rocks in turn are emplaced above a Paleozoic basement with granite intrusions of Devonian-Cretaceous, which crops out in some mountain ranges. Beneath Toney Mountain, the basaltic floor rises from an elevation of  beneath sea level, and the volcano is situated on the floor of a graben. The region is further characterized by a  large dome-like uplift, part of the West Antarctic Rift System, and it may reflect the presence of a stationary hotspot.

Toney Mountain was probably among those viewed from a distance by Admiral Byrd and others of the USAS in plane flights from the ship Bear in February 1940. It was mapped in December 1957 by the oversnow traverse party from Byrd Station to the Sentinel Range, 1957–58, led by C.R. Bentley who proposed the name. Named after George R. Toney, scientific leader at Byrd Station in 1957, a participant in several Antarctic and Arctic operations, serving in both field and administrative capacities.

See also
 List of volcanoes in Antarctica
 List of Ultras of Antarctica
 Williamson Ridge

References

External links
 "Mount Toney, Antarctica" on Peakbagger

Polygenetic shield volcanoes
Calderas of Antarctica
Volcanoes of Marie Byrd Land
Pleistocene shield volcanoes